Mogliano Rugby 1969 is an Italian rugby union club founded in 1956. They are based in Mogliano Veneto (Province of Treviso), in Veneto. Champions of Italy in the 2012–13 season, they are currently competing in the Italian Top10.

Honours
Italian championship
Champions (1): 2012–13

Current squad

References

External links
Official site

Italian rugby union teams
Rugby clubs established in 1956
Sport in Veneto